Noel Drumgoole (1931–1995) was an Irish hurler and manager who played as a full-back for the Dublin senior team and managed the Limerick senior hurling team on two occasions.

In 1984, he was named on the Centenary Team of players who had not won All-Ireland honours.

In 1968, Noel founded the Na Piarsaigh GAA Club on the north side of Limerick city. In 2011 Na Piarsaigh won their first County Senior Championship beating Ahane on a scoreline of 2-18 to 0-13. The club then went on to beat Crusheen of Clare in the Munster Club Final in Semple Stadium.

Playing career

Inter-county
In 1961, Noel, from the St Vincents club, captained Dublin when they won the Leinster Championship, beating Wexford 7-5 to 4-8 in the final. He led Dublin all  the way to the All-Ireland Final but they were narrowly beaten 0-16 to 1-12 by a marvellous Tipperary team.

Inter-provincial
Noel won three Railway Cup medals with Leinster in 1956, 1962 and 1964. He captained the 1962 team to success.

References

External links
Official Dublin Website
Dublin Website

Teams

1931 births
1995 deaths
St Vincents (Dublin) hurlers
Dublin inter-county hurlers
Leinster inter-provincial hurlers
Hurling managers
People educated at St. Joseph's CBS, Fairview